John Taylor ( 1580–1653) was an English artist who has been put forth as the most likely painter of the Chandos portrait of William Shakespeare. No other painting by him is known.

Taylor was probably a child actor with the Children of Paul's in the late 1590s. Though there was certainly a boy actor of that name with the troupe, it cannot be proved that this was the artist. The connection is based on George Vertue's assertion that the artist was also an actor. It is possible that confusion has arisen with the well-known actor Joseph Taylor, who also began his career as a child actor. Vertue also says that Taylor was an "intimate friend" of Shakespeare's.

By the 1620s Taylor was a member of the Painter-Stainers' Company, having at least six apprentices between 1626 and 1648. Taylor became a significant figure within the company, rising to the positions of Renter Warden (1632–33), Upper Warden (1635–36) and Master (1643–44). A portrait of Taylor in his official capacity as Warden is in the collection of the company.

Notes

1651 deaths
17th-century English painters
English male painters
Portraits of William Shakespeare
Year of birth uncertain